The AAAS Philip Hauge Abelson Prize is awarded by The American Association for the Advancement of Science for public servants, recognized for sustained exceptional contributions to advancing science or scientists, whose career has been distinguished both for scientific achievement and for other notable services to the scientific community. The prize is named after nuclear physicist Philip Abelson.The award consists of an engraved medallion and an honorarium of $5,000.

See also
 AAAS Award for Science Diplomacy
 AAAS Award for Scientific Freedom and Responsibility
 AAAS Prize for Behavioral Science Research
 Newcomb Cleveland Prize

References

Awards established in 1990
Science and technology awards
Philip Hauge Abelson Prize
American awards